This is a list of public art in Aberdeen, Scotland. This list applies only to works of public art on permanent display in an outdoor public space and does not, for example, include artworks in museums.

Aberdeen Harbour

Balgownie

City centre

Union Terrace

Duthie Park

Dyce

Hazlehead Park

Nigg

Old Aberdeen

Peterculter

References

Aberdeen
Public art
Outdoor sculptures in Scotland
Statues in Scotland